The rank structures of the three elements of the Canadian Cadet Organizations and the Navy League Cadet Corps (Canada) are as follows, comparatively:

*If an Army Cadet Corps has an affiliation with a unit of the Canadian Army that traditionally has different titles for the Ranks of "Private", "Corporal", and "Master Corporal", then they are then entitled to make use of those alternative titles for the ranks of "Lance Corporal", "Corporal, and "Master Corporal" in their units as well.

**The second rank of "Lance Corporal", formerly "Private", was changed in January 2010, due to the French translation "Soldat" being the word "Soldier".

In the guard regiments, Warrant Officers are known as "Colour Sergeants" and Second Lieutenants are known as "Ensigns", although the latter does not exist in the RCAC program.

Former Sea Cadet Ranks

See also 
 Royal Canadian Air Cadets
 Royal Canadian Army Cadets
 Royal Canadian Sea Cadets
 Navy League Cadet Corps (Canada)
 Ranks of the cadet forces of the United Kingdom
 New Zealand Cadet Forces ranks
 Australian Defence Force Cadets ranks
 Ranks of the Junior Reserve Officers' Training Corps
 Cadet grades and insignia of the Civil Air Patrol

External links
 https://web.archive.org/web/20171002051908/http://www.62phantomaircadets.ca/Cadet_Ranks.html
 http://captainjackson.ca/ranks/

Canadian Cadet organizations